John of Hesse-Braubach (17 June 1609, Darmstadt - 1 April 1651, Ems) was a German nobleman and general. He was born into the House of Hesse-Darmstadt and later became Landgrave of Hesse-Braubach.

Early life 
Johann was born as the seventh child and second surviving son of Louis V, Landgrave of Hesse-Darmstadt and his wife, Magdalene of Brandenburg, daughter of John George, Elector of Brandenburg.

Personal life 
He was married on 30 September 1647 to Countess Johannette of Sayn-Wittgenstein, the daughter of Ernest, Count of Sayn-Wittgenstein-Sayn (1594-1632) and his wife, Countess Louise Juliane of Erbach. The marriage remained childless. Johannette later married Johann Georg I, Duke of Saxe-Eisenach and had issue.

References

1609 births
1651 deaths
Generals of the Holy Roman Empire
German people of the Thirty Years' War
House of Hesse-Darmstadt
Military personnel from Darmstadt